2018 Karbi Anglong lynching was a violent incident of mob lynching that took place in Karbi Anglong, Assam, in India on 8 June 2018.

Fake news
Fake news spread via WhatsApp have been named as the cause of these two lynchings. The rumors said that child lifters were in the area.

Incident
The incident took place in the backdrop of widespread public rumours over rising child trafficking and the spate of killings known as the Indian WhatsApp lynchings. A mob of about 250 people attacked two men under suspicion of child trafficking and beat the two to death in a case of mistaken identity.

Arrests
As of June 21, 2018, 36 people had been arrested.

References

2018 in India
June 2018 events in India
Karbi Anglong district